Kayrakovo (Qayraq; , Monar) is a rural locality (a village) and the administrative centre of Kayrakovsky Selsoviet, Mishkinsky District, Bashkortostan, Russia. The population was 585 as of 2010. There are 11 streets.

Geography 
Kayrakovo is located 22 km west of Mishkino (the district's administrative centre) by road. Chebykovo is the nearest rural locality.

References 

Rural localities in Mishkinsky District